The Battle of Baton Rouge was a ground and naval battle in the American Civil War fought in East Baton Rouge Parish, Louisiana, on August 5, 1862. The Union victory halted Confederate attempts to recapture the capital city of Louisiana.

Background

On April 25, 1862, the day before New Orleans fell to the US Navy fleet under Admiral David Farragut, the Confederate state government decided to abandon Baton Rouge, moving first to Opelousas, and then to Shreveport. All cotton in the area was set afire to prevent it falling into Union hands. On May 9, Navy Commander James S. Palmer of the federal gunboat  landed at the town wharf and took possession, without resistance, of the Pentagon Barracks and the arsenal. Two weeks later, a party of guerrillas attacked a rowboat carrying a naval officer. On May 29, US Brigadier General Thomas Williams arrived with six regiments of infantry, two artillery batteries, and a troop of cavalry, and began the occupation of Baton Rouge.

During the summer, Major General Earl Van Dorn, commander of Confederate forces east of the Mississippi, resisted a Union bombardment of Vicksburg. The Confederate ironclad ram Arkansas had come down the Yazoo River, inflicting damage on the unprepared Union fleet as she passed through, and was anchored in Vicksburg. Van Dorn desired to regain Baton Rouge. It was thought that re-taking Baton Rouge would be key to driving the Union out of Louisiana, as they could then launch attacks along the Red River on Union-occupied territory, and threaten Union control of New Orleans.

5,000 men entrained from Vicksburg for Camp Moore, led by Maj. Gen. John C. Breckinridge, on July 27. They were joined by a small infantry division led by Brig. Gen. Daniel Ruggles at the camp. Simultaneously, the Arkansas was sailing down the Mississippi River, en route to engage Union ships near Baton Rouge. The men had a significant amount of matériel, and were well fed. General Williams reportedly had word of the forces' departure from Camp Moore on July 28. On August 4, after information was again received of the imminent arrival of the enemy, Union troops were formed up a mile outside of Baton Rouge. The Union men at Baton Rouge were not experienced, and were in training camp for only two weeks before being sent to Baton Rouge. The troops had few supplies because most were in New Orleans, which was considered more important.

Battle
The Confederates lost the element of surprise when they were discovered by Union sentries. Despite this, the attack was launched at daybreak on August 5.

The Union troops were in the center of Baton Rouge, while the Confederates were lined up in two divisions, north of the city. The action occurred around Florida Street, and began with the Confederates pushing their opponents all the way across town. Bitter fighting took place, especially around Magnolia Cemetery. The Union commander, Brigadier General Thomas Williams, was killed in action. Colonel Thomas W. Cahill took over.

The colonel led a retreat back to prepared defensive lines near the Penitentiary, under the protection of the Union warships. The Confederate troops began coming under fire from the gunboats. The undermanned Confederate ironclad Arkansas arrived not long after to engage the Union ironclad , but her engines failed just four miles above the city. Her commander ordered Arkansas set afire to prevent her capture.

Without any prospect of naval support, Breckenridge was unable to attack the Union positions and withdrew. Union troops evacuated the city a week later, concerned for the safety of New Orleans, but returned that autumn. Confederates occupied Port Hudson, which they held for almost another year.

The "Battle of Baton Rouge Commemorative Ceremony" is held every year on the first Saturday in August in and around Magnolia Cemetery, sponsored by the Foundation for Historical Louisiana.

Order of battle

Union Army
2nd Brigade, Department of the Gulf

Brig. Gen. Thomas Williams (k)

Col. Thomas W. Cahill

Infantry Regiments
9th Connecticut Infantry
21st Indiana Infantry
14th Maine Infantry
30th Massachusetts Infantry
6th Michigan Infantry
7th Vermont Infantry
4th Wisconsin Infantry

Artillery
Indiana Battery
2nd Battery, Massachusetts Light Artillery
4th Battery, Massachusetts Light Artillery
6th Battery, Massachusetts Light Artillery

Union Navy

USS Hartford
USS Westfield
USS Jackson
USS Cayuga
USS Katahdin
USS Brooklyn
USS Clifton
USS Sciota
USS Kineo
USS Essex

Confederate Army

Breckinridge's Corps: Maj. Gen. John C. Breckinridge

First Division: Brig. Gen. Charles Clark (w&c); Col. Winfield S. Statham

1st Brigade: Brig. Gen. Benjamin H. Helm (w); Col. Robert P. Trabue

31st Mississippi

4th Kentucky: Col. Robert P. Trabue 

9th Kentucky 

49th Alabama

4th Alabama Battalion

2nd Brigade: Col Winfield S. Statham; Col. Francis M. Walker

15th Mississippi

22nd Mississippi

19th Tennessee: Col. Francis M. Walker

20th Tennessee: Col. Thomas B. Smith

28th Tennessee

45th Tennessee

Second Division: Brig. Gen. Daniel Ruggles

1st Brigade: Col. Albert P. Thompson (w); Col. Joseph H. Lewis 

35th Alabama

3rd Kentucky

6th Kentucky: Col. Joseph H. Lewis

7th Kentucky

2nd Brigade: Col. Henry W. Allen (w); Col.  Gustavus A. Breaux

4th Louisiana

(Not Engaged) 12th Louisiana: Col. Thomas M. Scott

30th Louisiana: Col. Gustavus A. Breaux

9th Louisiana Battalion

Unattached: 

9th Louisiana Partisan Rangers Battalion

Artillery: 

Pettus' Mississippi Battery

Semmes' Confederate Regular Battery

Cobb's Kentucky Battery

(Bowen's Brigade) Not Engaged: Brig. Gen. John S. Bowen 

1st Missouri

9th Arkansas

10th Arkansas

6th Mississippi

33rd Mississippi

Caruthers' Mississippi Sharpshooters

Confederate Navy
CSS Arkansas; Lieut. Charles W. Read

Gallery

References

Notes
Abbreviations used in these notes
Official atlas: Atlas to accompany the official records of the Union and Confederate armies.
ORA (Official records, armies): War of the Rebellion: a compilation of the official records of the Union and Confederate Armies.
ORN (Official records, navies): Official records of the Union and Confederate Navies in the War of the Rebellion.

Citations

Sources

External links

 
 The Battle of Baton Rouge at Son of the South

 
1862 in Louisiana
1862 in the American Civil War
August 1862 events
Baton Rouge
Baton Rouge
East Baton Rouge Parish, Louisiana
History of Baton Rouge, Louisiana
Baton Rouge
Baton Rouge
West Baton Rouge Parish, Louisiana